Paso del Correo is a town southeast of Papantla, Veracruz. Its population is 1240 people. It is also a part of the municipality of Papantla.
This used to be part of the Totonac civilization, but in 2011 only 154 people have indigenous roots. The town is very small, with only 292 living units. Many kids do not get a good education since they become farmers at a very early age. The weather in Paso Del Correo is hot, warm, and  tropical throughout the year. It is to the southwest of the Rio Tecolutla.
Populated places in Veracruz